Robert Charles Hill (30 September 1917 – 28 November 1978) was an American diplomat.From 1973 to 1974 assistant secretary of defence(international security affairs).

Education
He was born in Littleton, New Hampshire.
He attended Dartmouth College in the class of 1942.
In 1947, he was a member of staff on the Senate Banking Committee.

Ambassador
He served as U.S. ambassador to several Latin American countries—El Salvador, Costa Rica and Mexico—and to Spain throughout his career.  
In 1961–1962, he was elected to the New Hampshire General Court. 
His last posting was in Argentina in the late 1970s, a period of great unrest in that country. He was also Assistant Secretary of State for Congressional Relations under President Eisenhower and Assistant Secretary of Defense for International Security Affairs under President Nixon.

Argentinean controversy

Human rights advocacy
In Argentina, the five-time conservative Republican ambassadorial appointee became best known for his efforts to keep the Argentina military junta that took power in March 1976 from engaging in massive human rights violations like those of Captain General Augusto Pinochet in neighboring Chile following his September 1973 coup. Upon finding out that U.S. Secretary of State Henry Kissinger had given the Argentine generals a "green light" for their own so-called "dirty war" in June 1976 while at an Organization of American States meeting in Santiago (at the Hotel Carrera, a place later made famous in the film Missing), Hill immediately engaged in behind-the-scenes efforts to roll back the Kissinger decision. Hill did this although Kissinger aides told him that, if he continued, the Secretary of State would likely have him fired, and even as left-wing Argentine guerrillas attempted to assassinate both the U.S. envoy and members of his family living in Buenos Aires. Hill's role as ambassador to Argentina again became prominent in 2016, when President Barack Obama traveled to that country to mark the 40th anniversary of the dirty "war" generals' supposedly bloodless coup.

Disagreement with Kissinger
As an article published in The Nation in October 1987 noted: "'Hill was shaken, he became very disturbed, by the case of the son of a thirty-year embassy employee, a student who was arrested, never to be seen again,' recalled former New York Times reporter Juan de Onis. 'Hill took a personal interest.' He went to the Interior Minister, a general with whom he had worked on drug cases, saying, 'Hey, what about this? We're interested in this case.' He questioned (Foreign Minister Cesar) Guzzetti and, finally, President Jorge R. Videla himself. 'All he got was stonewalling; he got nowhere.' de Onis said. 'His last year was marked by increasing disillusionment and dismay, and he backed his staff on human rights right to the hilt."

In a letter to The Nation editor Victor Navasky, protesting publication of the article, Kissinger claimed that: "At any rate, the notion of Hill as a passionate human rights advocate is news to all his former associates."

Kissinger aide Harry W. Shlaudeman later disagreed with Kissinger, telling the oral historian William E. Knight of the Association for Diplomatic Studies and Training Foreign Affairs Oral History Project: "It really came to a head when I was Assistant Secretary, or it began to come to a head, in the case of Argentina where the dirty war was in full flower. Bob Hill, who was Ambassador then in Buenos Aires, a very conservative Republican politician -- by no means liberal or anything of the kind, began to report quite effectively about what was going on, this slaughter of innocent civilians, supposedly innocent civilians -- this vicious war that they were conducting, underground war. He, at one time in fact, sent me a back-channel telegram saying that the Foreign Minister, who had just come for a visit to Washington and had returned to Buenos Aires, had gloated to him that Kissinger had said nothing to him about human rights. I don't know -- I wasn't present at the interview."

Navasky later wrote in his book about being confronted by Kissinger, "'Tell me, Mr. Navasky,' [Kissinger] said in his famous guttural tones, 'how is it that a short article in a obscure journal such as yours about a conversation that was supposed to have taken place years ago about something that did or didn't happen in Argentina resulted in sixty people holding placards denouncing me a few months ago at the airport when I got off the plane in Copenhagen?'"

Personal life
On 1 December 1945, Hill married Cecelia Gordon Bowdoin, who later became known as an accomplished mid-Atlantic tennis champion, duplicate bridge player, and an excellent horse woman. She died on Palm Sunday, 1 April 2012.

Hill's papers are held at Dartmouth College.

References

External links

2004 Story in The Guardian regarding Hill's disgust with human rights abuses by Argentinian generals, published by Uki Goñi but without appropriate credit 17 years after an article by Martin Edwin Andersen, "Kissinger and the 'Dirty War,'" appeared in The Nation on 31 October 1987  that broke the story about Hill fighting behind closed doors against Secretary of State Henry Kissinger's "green light" to the neo-Nazi junta for their "dirty war."
How Much Did the US Know About the Kidnapping, Torture, and Murder of Over 20,000 People in Argentina?  Now, President Obama has the chance to apologize for American complicity in the dirty war. Martin Edwin Andersen, The Nation, 4 March 2016.
Kissinger-responds 19 February 1988 letter from Kissinger to Victor Navasky, Editor of The Nation, protesting publication of a Memorandum of Conversation between Ambassador Hill and Patricia "Patt" Derian, the senior State Department official who spearheaded President Jimmy Carter's human rights revolution in U.S. foreign policy.
2004 Christopher Hitchens, " Kissinger Declassified," Vanity Fair, December 2004
 David Corn, "New Memo: Kissinger Gave the 'Green Light' for Argentina's Dirty War," Mother Jones, 14 January 2014
 The Association for Diplomatic Studies and Training Foreign Affairs Oral History Project: Ambassador Harry W. Shlaudeman 
The Political Graveyard: Robert Charles Hill
Register of the Robert Charles Hill Papers and selected documents online at the Hoover Institution Archives, Stanford University.
 The Papers of Roger C. Hill at Dartmouth College Library

1917 births
1978 deaths
Taft School alumni
Dartmouth College alumni
Ambassadors of the United States to Costa Rica
Ambassadors of the United States to El Salvador
Ambassadors of the United States to Mexico
Ambassadors of the United States to Spain
Ambassadors of the United States to Argentina
People from Littleton, New Hampshire
United States Assistant Secretaries of Defense
20th-century American diplomats